Kléberson Davide (born 20 July 1985) is a Brazilian track and field athlete who specialises in the 800 metres.

Born in Conchal, São Paulo, Davide won his first major youth title in the 800 m at the 2002 South American Youth Championships. He reached the semi-finals of the 2004 World Junior Championships in Athletics. He made his first impression on the senior circuit in 2007: he became the 800 m national champion, took the silver medal at the 2007 Pan American Games, and reached the semis at the 2007 World Championships in Athletics. Under the guidance of coach Clodoaldo Lopes do Carmo (an Olympic finalist and former South American record holder), Davide represented Brazil at the 2008 Summer Olympics.

Davide started the 2009 outdoor season strongly, setting a new personal best and world leading time of 1:44.67 in April. At the Grande Prêmio Brasil Caixa meet Davide again improved his personal best, beating his previous mark by 0.02 seconds. His coach stated that he expected Davide to reach 1:44.5 minutes at the 2009 World Championships in Berlin. He took silver at the 2009 South American Championships in Athletics with a time of 1:49.33, finishing behind compatriot Fabiano Peçanha.

On January 21, 2012, he married sprinter Franciela Krasucki in Valinhos, São Paulo.

Major competitions record

Personal bests

All information taken from IAAF profile.

References

External links
 
 

1985 births
Living people
Athletes (track and field) at the 2007 Pan American Games
Athletes (track and field) at the 2008 Summer Olympics
Athletes (track and field) at the 2011 Pan American Games
Athletes (track and field) at the 2016 Summer Olympics
Olympic athletes of Brazil
Brazilian male middle-distance runners
Pan American Games silver medalists for Brazil
Pan American Games medalists in athletics (track and field)
South American Games gold medalists for Brazil
South American Games medalists in athletics
Competitors at the 2002 South American Games
Competitors at the 2014 South American Games
Medalists at the 2007 Pan American Games
Medalists at the 2011 Pan American Games
Sportspeople from São Paulo (state)
21st-century Brazilian people
20th-century Brazilian people